George Caldwell (8 January 1807 – 5 March 1863) was an English cricketer who made his first-class cricket debut in 1829.

Early life
He was born at Hilborough in Norfolk in 1807, the second son of Ralph Caldwell and his wife Louisa Isham, daughter of Sir Justinian Isham, 7th Baronet. He studied at Merton College, Oxford, graduating BA in 1829.

Cricketer
Caldwell played in a total of 10 first-class matches between 1829 and 1833, primarily for sides associated with MCC. He played club cricket, mainly for teams across Norfolk between 1829 and 1831 and later for MCC.

His brother, Henry Berney Caldwell, also played first-class cricket, making five appearances in 1832.

Journalism
Caldwell wrote articles about sport for The Field and Bell's Life in London under the pseudonym Childers and for Spirit of the Times in New York under the name Censor. As "Censor" he wrote open letters in Sporting Life, in 1859 attacking the former Member of Parliament Apsley Pellatt, who had proposed regulation of betting tips in newspapers. He went on to attack the Jockey Club and Albert, Prince Consort. He was replaced by Henry Hall Dixon. 

Caldwell died in 1863 at Ramsgate in Kent aged 56.

Notes

References

1807 births
Year of death unknown
English cricketers
English cricketers of 1826 to 1863
Married v Single cricketers
Marylebone Cricket Club cricketers
People from Hilborough